Fumina South is a locality in Victoria, Australia. Located on Willowgrove Road, in the Shire of Baw Baw, it is an isolated pocket near the foothills of Mount Baw Baw. Fumina South has a population of approximately 50 people, mostly weekend farmers and  retirees, although it was once a bustling community with its own post office and school.

The Post Office opened in 1907 as Duggan, was renamed Fumina South in 1925 and closed in 1962.

References

Towns in Victoria (Australia)
Shire of Baw Baw